The 2019 season was the 12th season for the Indian Premier League franchise Kings XI Punjab. They were one of the eight teams that competed in the 2019 Indian Premier League. They were captained by Ravichandran Ashwin. KXIP finished 6th in the IPL and did not qualify for the playoffs.

Background

In October 2018 Marcus Stoinis was traded to Royal Challengers Bangalore for Mandeep Singh. 

In November 2018, Kings XI announced their list of retained players for the 2019 season. The list included K. L. Rahul, Chris Gayle, Andrew Tye, Mayank Agarwal, Ankit Rajpoot, Mujeeb Ur Rahman, Karun Nair, David Miller and Ravichandran Ashwin.

On 18 December 2018, the IPL player auction was held in which the Kings XI signed up 13 more players: Varun Chakravarthy, Sam Curran, Mohammed Shami, Prabhsimran Singh, Nicholas Pooran, Moises Henriques, Hardus Viljoen, Darshan Nalkande, Sarfaraz Khan, Arshdeep Singh, Agnivesh Ayachi, Harpreet Brar and Murugan Ashwin.

Squad
 Players with international caps are listed in bold.

Coaching and support staff

 Head coach - Mike Hesson 
 Batting coach - Sridharan Sriram
 Bowling coach - Ryan Harris
 Fielding coach - Craig McMillan
 Strength and conditioning coach -  Nishant Thakur

Ref

Season

League table

Fixtures

Statistics

Most runs 

 Source: IPL

Most wickets

 Source:Cricinfo

Player of the match awards

References

2019 Indian Premier League
Punjab Kings seasons